Ufuk Talay (born 26 March 1976) is an Australian football coach and former player. Talay was suited to play in central midfield and was known for his good distribution and on-field vision. He is the current manager of Wellington Phoenix.

Club career
Talay first entered a national competition for Marconi-Fairfield in the now defunct NSL, as first an understudy to Steve Corica and later as a midfield partner.  He made his debut late in the 92/93 season, playing the last six regular season games and scoring in the final round. Marconi went on to win the grand final with seventeen-year-old Talay watching as an unused substitute.  Talay remained with Marconi for a further two years, becoming a regular starter in the first team.

Turkey
Seeking a more promising career to build on his NSL and national team experience, Talay joined Turkish giants Galatasaray in the Turkish Super League. He spent time on loan out to other sides in the Turkish top flight and lower divisions with Antalyaspor, Karabükspor and Bursaspor, followed by a brief six-month stint in the French second division with Nîmes Olympique, before Galatasaray transferred him to Gaziantepspor in 2002.  He shortly moved again to second division side Mersin Idman Yurdu, before being enticed to return to Australia with Sydney FC in the new A-League competition.

Sydney FC
As the sixteenth player signed to the inaugural Sydney FC squad, Talay sought to reignite his football career and at Sydney was reunited with former Marconi teammates Corica and Matthew Bingley, as well as Clint Bolton and Robbie Middleby whom shared the experience of the Youth World Cup.  He has been described by Socceroo Josip Skoko as "the best player to never represent Australia", and Talay has expressed his desire for a full international cap.  A motivation for his return to Australia is "the chance to get back in the spotlight and get that Aussie shirt".

His first season was cut short by a knee injury, missing the last seven games (including the grand final) after solid performances in the A-League and Club World Cup.  As the 2006/07 season started, Talay found himself on the outer as new coach Terry Butcher favoured a central pairing of Terry McFlynn and Mark Milligan.  His early appearances of the season were as a late substitute, before other injuries opened the opportunity to win back a first team place, which he held for the remainder of the year.  He also took over penalty-duties for the side, making the most of the opportunity twice in the year.  Two yellow cards in the final league match saw Talay suspended for Sydney's first leg final against Newcastle but on return for the second leg he could not prevent the club's elimination.

Following the close of the A-League season, Sydney proceeded on to the AFC Champions League 2007 competition.  Talay played all six group-stage games, scoring goals against Shanghai Shenhua and Urawa.  In the return match against Shanghai Shenhua, he sensationally hit the crossbar from the penalty spot, Sydney eventually drawing the match 0–0.'

Talay remains with Sydney for the 2007/08 season, continuing into the final season of his original three-year contract, playing every game of the season except one (due to suspension after receiving a fourth yellow card for the year the previous match).  In December 2007, it was announced that he would follow former Sydney FC teammate Mark Rudan to Japan, signing with second division side Avispa Fukuoka, the move completed in February at the close of Sydney's season.

Avispa Fukuoka
Talay Joined fellow Australians Mark Rudan and Newcastle's Joel Griffiths becoming the third Australian in their squad. He was an immediate success, scoring twice in three games, and netting a third in his fifth game.

North Queensland Fury FC
Talay returned to Australia in 2009 after signing a two-year deal with newly established A-League franchise North Queensland Fury FC, after expressing interest in returning home to his family. He played in their inaugural year, the A-League 2009-10 season and the following season. Talay was recommended as captain by former teammate Robbie Middleby.

Sydney United
Despite announcing his retirement once North Queensland Fury folded, It was announced on 12 March 2011 that Talay had signed for NSW Premier League club Sydney United.

International career
His first national level selection was for the Young Socceroos in 1994.  He joined the squad in a number of Youth World Cup qualifiers and retained his place for the 1995 Youth World Cup in Qatar.

In January 2008, he was named by coach Pim Verbeek in a 22-man Socceroos training camp squad, made up entirely of A-League players, in preparation for the 2010 FIFA World Cup third round qualifiers in Sydney. However, he did not make the final 39-man squad for the qualifiers.

Coaching career
Talay was assistant coach at the FFA Centre of Excellence and the Australia under-17 team, before replacing Paul Okon as head coach of the under-20 team in September 2016. In June 2018, he left his role with the national set-up to join Sydney FC as assistant to Steve Corica, a teammate during his previous spell at the club.

Wellington Phoenix

2019-20
On 4 May 2019, Talay was announced as head coach for the Wellington Phoenix for the upcoming 2019–20 A-League season. In his first press conference, Talay expressed his idea of building a young team with a strong Kiwi core. Talay had a positive start to his managerial tenure with the Wellington Phoenix when he led them to a 7–0 victory over Wairarapa United in a pre-season friendly in his first match in charge.

His tenure started with four consecutive defeats, the worst start in club history. However, Talay helped the Phoenix achieve a top three finish for the first time in the Phoenix's 13-year history, capping off of a historic season which included a club record-equalling four match winning streak and a nine-match unbeaten run from 10 Nov 2019 to 11 Jan 2020. Talay introduced a fast-paced, free-flowing style of Phoenix football that had many pundits branding the Phoenix as the A-League's most exciting team to watch. Talay reiterated his commitment to the Phoenix, knocking back offers from A-league clubs Melbourne Victory and Western Sydney Wanderers.

In mid-2020, Talay's first year at the helm of Wellington was honoured when he was voted as A-League Coach of the Year.

2020-21
With the Phoenix forced to re-locate to Wollongong, Australia for the entirety of the 2020/21 A-League season, Talay’s side finished in seventh place – just one point away from a top six finish. The Phoenix played particularly well in the second half of the campaign, setting a new club record by going 11 matches undefeated to finish out the season. Following the end of the season, Talay said he considered it a privilege to coach the Phoenix.
On 21 May 2021, Talay signed a two-year extension to his contract.

2021-22
In his third season in charge, Talay guided the Phoenix to a sixth placed finish securing a playoff spot in the finals series. They lost 1-0 to eventual winners Western United in the elimination final. Despite the early exit, the Phoenix exceeded expectations to finish sixth and qualify for the finals series given all the obstacles they had to overcome in 2021-22, such as spending the majority of the season away from home due to COVID-19 travel restrictions.

Personal life
Talay is of Turkish descent, and is able to speak Turkish fluently.

Career statistics

(correct as of 17 December 2018)

Managerial statistics

Honours

Player
Marconi Stallions
 NSL Championship: 1992–93

Galatasaray
 Süper Lig: 1998–99
 Turkish Cup: 1995–96

Sydney FC
 A-League Championship: 2005–06
 Oceania Club Championship: 2005

References

External links
 

 North Queensland Fury profile
 OzFootball profile

1976 births
Living people
Australian people of Turkish descent
Soccer players from Sydney
Australia youth international soccer players
Australia under-20 international soccer players
Australian expatriate soccer players
Expatriate footballers in Turkey
Expatriate footballers in Japan
A-League Men players
National Soccer League (Australia) players
Süper Lig players
J2 League players
Antalyaspor footballers
Avispa Fukuoka players
Bursaspor footballers
Galatasaray S.K. footballers
Gaziantepspor footballers
Kardemir Karabükspor footballers
Marconi Stallions FC players
Mersin İdman Yurdu footballers
Nîmes Olympique players
Northern Fury FC players
Sydney FC players
Sydney United 58 FC players
Association football midfielders
Australian soccer players
Australian expatriate soccer coaches